Wang Baoqiang (born 29 May 1984) is a Chinese actor, martial artist and director. His debut role was that of Yuan Fengming in the movie Blind Shaft, for which he shared the Best New Performer prize at the 2003 Golden Horse Awards.

Early life
Wang Baoqiang was born in Nanhe County, Xingtai, Hebei, on May 29, 1984, to Wang Yinsheng and Liu Huan, both his parents are peasants.
When Wang Baoqiang was 8 years old, his village showed the movie Shaolin Temple starring Jet Li, which inspired him to become a martial arts star in movies like Jet Li or Jackie Chan. Wang insisted on going to a Shaolin Temple though his family opposed it, in the same year. He trained in Shaolin martial arts.

Career
Prior to entering the film industry, Wang was an unskilled labourer who was paid 25 yuan a day; he had not been home for over two years as he was unable to afford the railway ticket. Wang was initially rejected from acting due to his height, but got his start working as an extra in Beijing. In 2003, he was cast in the independent film Blind Shaft as a "down-to-earth" guy. For his role in Blind Shaft, Wang received the Best Newcomer award at the Golden Horse Film Festival.

Wang then starred in Feng Xiaogang's 2004 film A World Without Thieves as a naïve village boy, a performance which received critical acclaim.

In 2006, Wang starred in the military drama Soldiers Sortie, playing a soldier who is physically slow but who wins respect because of his strong faith and untiring efforts. The drama was a huge hit, and gained Wang wide critical acclaim and huge popularity.

In 2009, Wang starred in another military drama, My Brother is Shun Liu as the title character. The drama was another huge success for Wang.

For his performance in the 2011 comedy film Hello, Mr. Tree, Wang won multiple awards. He won the for Best Actor at the 9th Vladivostok International Film Festival in Russia, the award for Best Actor at the 5th Asia Pacific Screen Awards, the award for Best Actor at the New York Chinese Film Festival, the award for Best Actor of the 2011-2012 Chinese Youth Film Handbook, and the award for Best Actor at the Italy Asian Film Festival.

Wang's 2012 comedy film Lost in Thailand was a smash hit at the box-office. Wang is also noted for his role in the comedy film series Detective Chinatown and its sequel, Detective Chinatown 2.

In 2017, Wang made his directorial debut with the fantasy comedy film Buddies in India.

In 2019, Wang starred in Stephen Chow's comedy film  The New King of Comedy.

In 2020, starred in Chen Sicheng's movie "Detective Chinatown 3".

Personal life
Wang Baoqiang married Ma Rong on 10 February 2010. They have two children. On 14 August 2016, Wang made a post to Sina Weibo announcing he would divorce Ma. He accused her of entering an extramarital affair with his agent, Song Zhe, and transferring/concealing some of the couple's assets. In a later Sina Weibo post, Ma said Wang had abandoned their family, and threatened to sue him for defamation; she filed a case against Wang on August 16. The divorce became a trending topic on Sina Weibo, where posts with the hashtag #WangBaoQiangDivorce were viewed over five billion times. Wang filed for divorce that was accepted by a Beijing Court, and the trial was held in October 2016. Song's wife also filed for divorce.On October 18, 2018, the Beijing Chaoyang Court sentenced the first instance of Wang Baoqiang's former agent Song Zhe for the crime of embezzlement and was sentenced to 6 years in prison.

Filmography

Film

Television series

Variety show

Awards and nominations

Forbes China Celebrity 100

References

External links

 
 Wang Baoqiang on Sina Weibo

1984 births
Living people
Male actors from Hebei
People from Xingtai
Politicians from Xingtai
People's Republic of China Buddhists
People's Republic of China politicians from Hebei
Chinese male film actors
Chinese male television actors
21st-century Chinese male actors
Participants in Chinese reality television series
Disciples of Shaolin Temple
Shaolin Temple
Asia Pacific Screen Award winners